Pablo Cuevas was the defending champion but lost in the first round to Mario Vilella Martínez.

Guido Pella won the title after defeating Carlos Berlocq 6–3, 3–6, 6–1 in the final.

Seeds

Draw

Finals

Top half

Bottom half

References
Main draw
Qualifying draw

2018 ATP Challenger Tour
2018 Singles
2018 in Uruguayan tennis